Hyboderini is a tribe of beetles in the subfamily Cerambycinae, containing the following genera and species:

 Genus Hybodera
 Hybodera debilis LeConte, 1874
 Hybodera tuberculata LeConte, 1873
 Genus Lampropterus
 Lampropterus cyanipennis (LeConte, 1873)
 Lampropterus ruficollis (LeConte, 1873)
 Genus Megobrium
 Megobrium edwardsi LeConte, 1873
 Genus Pachymerola
 Pachymerola mariaeugeniae Noguera, 2005
 Pachymerola ruficollis Giesbert, 1987
 Pachymerola toledoi Chemsak & Noguera, 1997
 Pachymerola vitticollis Bates, 1892
 Pachymerola wappesi Giesbert, 1993
 Genus Pseudopilema
 Pseudopilema hoppingi (Van Dyke, 1920)

References

 
Cerambycinae